Jerónimo Cortés (c. 1560 - c. 1611) was a Spanish mathematician, astronomer, naturalist and Valencian compiler.

Works 

Many of Cortés works involved compilations of knowledge and writings of other authors. Some works include:
 Tratado del cómputo por la mano (1591)
 Compendio de reglas breves (1594)
 Lunario perpetuo (1594)
 
 Fisonomía natural y varios secretos de naturaleza (1597).
 Aritmética práctica (1604)
 Libro y tratado de los animales terrestres y volátiles (1613)

References

Further reading 

 
 
 
  Vol. I. Vol. II-III. Vol. IV.
 
  Vol. I. Vol. II.
 
 
 
 
 
 
 
 
 
 
 
 
 

17th-century Spanish mathematicians
17th-century Spanish astronomers
Spanish naturalists
1611 deaths
Year of birth uncertain
16th-century Spanish mathematicians